Martins Creek is a tributary of the Delaware River in Bucks County, Pennsylvania, meeting its confluence at the Delaware River 122 river mile.

Statistics
It was entered into the Geographic Names Information System of the U.S. Geological Survey as identification number 1180503, U.S. Department of the Interior Geological Survey I.D. is 02920.

Course
Martins Creek is contained wholly with in Falls Township. Just after it passes under New Falls Road, it joins with another unnamed tributary from the right, at which it makes a left turn then bends right again flowing southeast until it passes under U.S. Route 13 where it meets with Rock Run from the left where Martins turns right flowing almost due south.

Municipalities
Falls Township

Crossings and Bridges

See also
List of rivers of Pennsylvania
List of rivers of the United States
List of Delaware River tributaries

References

Rivers of Bucks County, Pennsylvania
Rivers of Pennsylvania
Tributaries of the Delaware River